Austrian pair Martin Fischer and Philipp Oswald won this tournament, by defeating fourth-seeded Pierre-Ludovic Duclos and Rogério Dutra da Silva 4–6, 6–3, [10–5] in the final match.

Seeds

Draw

Draw

References
 Doubles Draw

Sicilia Classic Mancuso Company Cup - Doubles
Sicilia Classic